Teo Nie Ching (born 27 January 1981) is a Malaysian politician who has served as the Deputy Minister of Communications and Digital in the Pakatan Harapan (PH) administration under Prime Minister Anwar Ibrahim and Minister Fahmi Fadzil since December 2022 and the Member of Parliament (MP) for Kulai since May 2013. She served as the Deputy Minister of Education in the PH administration under former Prime Minister Mahathir Mohamad and former Ministers Maszlee Malik from July 2018 to his resignation in January 2020 and Mahathir himself in an acting capacity briefly from January to February 2020, from July 2018 to the collapse of the PH administration in February 2020 and the MP for Serdang from March 2008 to May 2013. She is a member of the Democratic Action Party (DAP), a component party of the PH opposition coalition. She has served as National Publicity Secretary of DAP since March 2022, International Secretary of DAP from November 2017 to March 2022, Assistant National Publicity Secretary of DAP and Assistant State Organising Secretary of DAP of Selangor from 2008 to 2011.

Teo was born to a political family. Her father was Secretary of the Labis Campaign Committee of DAP, while her sister and brother-in-law were Chief and Deputy Chair of the DAPSY Johor State Council.

Personal life
Teo completed her secondary school education in Chinese High School, Batu Pahat, Johor. She pursued her tertiary education under a twinning programme and obtained her law degree from the University of the West of England, in 2002. After graduating from the university, she spent one year to work as a librarian in UK and travel around Europe. In 2004, she received her Certificate in Legal Practice from the University of Malaya.

Political career

Prior to the GE-14, Teo recorded a video promising to recognize Malaysia Chinese independent high school Unified Examination Certificate once Pakatan Harapan formed the federal government.

Deputy Minister of Education 

As a Chinese-ethnic, and being appointed as the deputy minister of education, Teo is urged by MCA to fulfill her promise and strengthen the Chinese education. Education Minister Dr Maszlee Malik confirmed that Pakatan Harapan will stick to its manifesto and recognise the UEC as a legitimate entry requirement for tertiary studies. However, there is no specific timeline set for this manifesto to be fulfilled.

Controversies and issues
On 25 July 2019, Sin Chew Daily in the Chinese newspaper front-paged that next year's Standard 4 Bahasa Malaysia syllabus will contain six pages of introduction to what the Jawi script in all vernacular schools. Following the rejection from NGOs such as Dong Zong, the cabinet approved that the Ministry of Education to allow vernacular schools teaching only Jawi script as a basic level, and not khat calligraphy with the consent of the students, parents as well as each school's Parent Teacher Association (PTA).

Election results

In the 2008 general election, Teo ran for the Parliamentary seat of Serdang on a DAP ticket. She won against the candidate from Barisan Nasional, Datuk Hoh Hee Lee, with a majority of 21,025 votes. She obtained 47,444 votes comparing to her opposing candidate who only collected 26,419 votes.

In the 2013 general election, Teo switched to the state of Johor, in the Barisan Nasional stronghold Kulai, and defeated their candidate Tay Chin Hein by 13,450 out of 43,338 votes.

In the 2017 DAP re-elections, Teo received 1080 votes and was appointed International Secretary.

In the 2018 general election, Teo reelected for the Parliamentary seat of Kulai in the state of Johor. She defeated her 2 opponents, Tang Nai Soon (MCA) and Juwahir Amin (PAS) by 32,748 (64.68%, up 6.9%) out of 55,312 votes majority.

Notes and references

External links

 Teo Nie Ching's Blog
 Democratic Action Party Malaysia

Living people
1981 births
People from Batu Pahat
People from Johor
Malaysian politicians of Chinese descent
Democratic Action Party (Malaysia) politicians
Members of the Dewan Rakyat
Women members of the Dewan Rakyat
Women in Selangor politics
Women in Johor politics
Alumni of the University of the West of England, Bristol
21st-century Malaysian women politicians
21st-century Malaysian politicians